The discography and filmography of Neil Young contains both albums and films produced by Young. Through his career most of Young's work has been recorded for and distributed by Reprise Records, a company owned by Warner Bros. Records since 1963 and now part of the Warner Music Group. The only exceptions are Young's five albums for Geffen Records in the 1980s, which were once distributed by Warner, but are now distributed by Universal Music Group.

Albums

Studio albums

Notes

EPs

Live albums

 
Neil Young has included material recorded live on many of his albums; listed here are albums consisting completely or primarily of live concert recordings. Time Fades Away consists of previously unreleased material. Weld and Arc were initially released as a single package, Arc-Weld. See also the Archives Series listed separately below.

Compilation albums

Box sets

Soundtracks

Archives series

Singles

 Peaked at No. 33 on the US Hot Country Songs chart

Other appearances

Studio appearances

Live appearances

Guest appearances

Filmography

Directed films (as Bernard Shakey)

Acting performances 
 1987 - Made in Heaven - as Truck Driver
1988 - '68 - as Westy
1990 - Love at Large - as Rick
2018 - Paradox - as The Man in the Black Hat

Documentary appearances 
 1978 – The Last Waltz ("Helpless" with The Band)
 1983 – Neil Young in Berlin (concert film by Michael Lindsay-Hogg)
 1984 – Solo Trans (concert film by Hal Ashby)
 1985 – Live Aid (solo and with Crosby, Stills & Nash)
 1989 – Freedom: A Live Acoustic Concert (filmed at Jones Beach and The Palladium, New York, September 5–6, 1989)
 1991 – Neil Young & Crazy Horse: Ragged Glory (Ragged Glory music video compilation)
 1993 – Bob Dylan: 30th Anniversary Concert Celebration ("Just Like Tom Thumb's Blues", "All Along the Watchtower", "My Back Pages")
 1993 – Neil Young Unplugged
 1994 – Neil Young & Crazy Horse: The Complex Sessions (directed by Jonathan Demme)
 1997 – Year of the Horse (documentary by Jim Jarmusch)
 2000 – Neil Young: Silver and Gold
 2000 – Neil Young: Red Rocks Live
 2001 – America: A Tribute to Heroes ("Imagine")
 2005 – Live 8 ("Four Strong Winds", "When God Made Me", "Rockin' in the Free World")
 2006 – Neil Young: Heart of Gold (concert film by Jonathan Demme)
 2009 – Neil Young: Trunk Show (concert film by Jonathan Demme)
 2011 – Pearl Jam Twenty (documentary film by Cameron Crowe)
 2011 – Neil Young Journeys (concert film by Jonathan Demme)
 2013 – Sound City (documentary by Dave Grohl)
 2014 – A MusiCares Tribute to Bruce Springsteen ("Born in the U.S.A.")

See also 
"Tears Are Not Enough" - single by Northern Lights.

References

External links
 
 

Discography
Discographies of Canadian artists